Pseudocercospora rhapisicola is a fungal plant pathogen infecting palms.

References

External links
 Index Fungorum
 USDA ARS Fungal Database

Fungal plant pathogens and diseases
Palm diseases
rhapisicola
Fungi described in 1989